Field of Honor is a 1986 Dutch/South Korean war film set during the Korean War, directed by Kim Dae-hie and Hans Scheepmaker.

Plot
After an attack by Chinese troops, a Dutch sergeant (whose troops committed atrocities against the local population) finds himself alone in the field. He meets a young Korean woman who tries to save her little brother who is shell shocked. This changes the sergeant's outlook on the war.

Cast
 Everett McGill – Sergeant 'Sire' De Koning
 Ron Brandsteder – Tiny
 Bart Römer – Lieutenant
 Anis de Jong – Taihutu (as Annies De Jong) 
 Lee Hye-young – Sun Yi (as Hey Young Lee)
 Kim Dong-hyeon – Applesan (as Dong Hyum Kim) 
 Min Yu – Kim 
 Mark Van Eeghem – Brammetje
 Frank Schaafsma – Wiel 
 Guus van der Made – Leen 
 Choi Jae-ho – Chinese Medic (as Jae Ho Choi)
 Mike Mooney – Journalist
 Jon Bluming – Platoon Sergeant 
 Fritz Homann – Truck Driver 
 David Hartung – Radioman

Reception
The film got a negative review in the Dutch communist newspaper De Waarheid.

References

External links

Movie trailer of Field of Honor

1986 films
1980s war films
South Korean war drama films
1980s English-language films
1980s Korean-language films
Korean War films
Golan-Globus films
Films scored by Roy Budd
Films produced by Menahem Golan
Films produced by Yoram Globus
1986 multilingual films
Dutch multilingual films
South Korean multilingual films
Dutch war drama films